How Many Dreams? is the forthcoming fourth studio album by Australian indie rock band DMA's, scheduled for release on 31 March 2023. It announced on 19 October 2022, alongside the release of "Everybody's Saying Thursday's the Weekend". 

The band describe it the album as "a labour of love", having worked through over 70 demos and recording between lockdown restrictions. Tommy O'Dell said "We spent a long time through lockdown writing a bunch of tunes and also tunes that have been built up over the band’s career. I feel like out of all the albums we've done, for this one, it’s probably the best selection of songs we’ve had to choose from". 

In January 2023, Johnny Took said, "Our palette for How Many Dreams? album was a lot broader because we've learned so much since our debut. We've listened to so much more music between then and now, which has shaped us. It felt like a first outing all over again."

Promotion
The album will be promoted by a UK tour, commencing on 5 April 2023.

Singles
"I Don't Need to Hide" was released on 17 August 2022 as the album's lead single. About the song, DMA's guitarist Jonny Took said "There's a confidence you obtain when you find someone who loves you for all your faults, quirks and obscurities." The song coincided with announcement of three headline shows in the United Kingdom in October 2022. 

"Everybody's Saying Thursday's the Weekend" was released alongside the album's announcement. The song is described by Triple J'''s Al Newstead as "a bright, optimistic number with a title drawn from a phone call guitarist Johnny Took had with a mate trying to coax him out for a post-lockdown pint." 

"Olympia" was released on 9 December 2022. Emma Whines from The Music'' said "With fast electric riffs and an uptempo beat, this is the perfect song for the summer. DMA's continue to deliver hits in their signature style, and 'Olympia' is at the top of the pile."

"Fading Like a Picture" was released on 20 January 2023 as the album's fourth single. According to a press release, it was mostly written by Tommy O’Dell, with guitarist Matthew Mason adding the song's riff. Johnny Took said "We used the middle-eight from another demo as the chorus." Took called it "A true DMA's collaboration."

"Something We Are Overcoming" was released on 1 March 2023. The band said it "...started as a moving ballad about perseverance but quickly morphed into a trance-y anthem of a side quest that is slightly but steadily DMA's."

Track listing

References

2023 albums
DMA's albums
Upcoming albums